The following is a list of licensed FM radio stations in the city of Naples, Italy, sorted by frequency.

See also 
 List of radio stations in Italy
 List of radio stations in Turin
 List of radio stations in Rome
 List of radio stations in Palermo

Naples
Radio stations
Radio stations